Casearia mexiae is a species of flowering plant in the family Salicaceae. It is endemic to Ecuador.  Its natural habitat is subtropical or tropical moist montane forests.

References

Flora of Ecuador
mexiae
Endangered plants
Taxonomy articles created by Polbot